WWRK is a classic rock radio station located in Florence, South Carolina, United States. The station is licensed by the Federal Communications Commission (FCC) to broadcast on 970 AM with power of 10,000 watts during the day and 31 watts at night, non-directionally. WWRK is owned by iHeartMedia.

History
WWRK signed on as WJMX on July 13, 1947. This station also covered NASCAR races in the past like the 1955 Southern 500 that took place in nearby Darlington. The station featured local as well as national programming from the ABC Radio Network. By the 1980s, WJMX was Top 40 under the handle "97X" but was beaten out by new upstart WPDZ (now WJMX-FM). The format migrated to its newly acquired 106.3 FM frequency (now WYNN-FM) and the station switched to Adult Contemporary before transitioning to News/Talk.

Qantum Communications Inc. purchased Florence's Root Communications Group LP stations in 2003.

On July 16, 2012, WJMX announced that after carrying Rush Limbaugh for over twenty years, the station would replace him with Mike Huckabee. At the time, the station manager said that the distributor wanted too much money to air the show. Limbaugh was then picked up by WFRK.

The station changed its call sign to the current WWRK on October 30, 2013, swapping calls with its sister station at 1400 AM. At that time, WWRK began simulcasting urban contemporary WRZE, which was branded as "Swagga 94.1 & 105.9".

On May 15, 2014, Qantum Communications announced that it would sell its 29 stations, including WWRK, to Clear Channel Communications (now iHeartMedia), in a transaction connected to Clear Channel's sale of WALK AM-FM in Patchogue, New York to Connoisseur Media via Qantum. The transaction was consummated on September 9, 2014.

In August 2017, WRZE, WWRK and the translators began simulcasting WDAR-FM, which took over the urban contemporary format.

On September 14, 2017, WRZE, WWRK and the translators dropped the simulcast with WDAR-FM and switched to classic rock, branded as "Rock 94.1 - 97.9 - 105.9". The stations air the syndicated "Rover's Morning Glory" in mornings from 6 to 10 A.M.

As of 2021, the simulcast on 105.9 FM had ended, as W290CD began simulcasting WJMX. and that translator was used by WJMX.

Translators
In addition to the main station, WWRK is relayed by a translator to widen its broadcast area.

References

External links

WRK
IHeartMedia radio stations
Classic rock radio stations in the United States